William Sloane-Stanley (25 June 1780 – 11 April 1860) was an English politician. He served as the Tory Member of Parliament for Orford from 1807 to 1812, and for Stockbridge from 1830 to 1831.

He was the eldest son of Hans Sloane, who adopted the name and arms of Stanley in 1824, and his wife, Sarah Fuller. In 1806, he married Lady Gertrude Howard, daughter of Frederick Howard, 5th Earl of Carlisle. They had two sons and three daughters.

References

1780 births
1860 deaths
People educated at Eton College
Alumni of the University of St Andrews
Members of the Parliament of the United Kingdom for English constituencies
MPs for rotten boroughs
Tory MPs (pre-1834)
UK MPs 1807–1812
UK MPs 1830–1831
People from South Stoneham